Banana Island Ghost (B.I.G) is a 2017 Nigerian fantasy action comedy film. The film was written and directed by BB Sasore and executively produced by Derin Adeyokunnu and Biola Alabi. It stars Chigul, Patrick Diabuah, Ali Nuhu, Saheed Balogun, Tina Mba and Bimbo Manuel.

Plot 
A man who dies from an accident is scared to go to heaven because he does not have a soul mate. He negotiates with God who gives him three days to go back to earth and find one. He is paired with Ijeoma, who has three days to keep her father's house on Banana Island from being reclaimed by the bank.

Cast 
 Chioma "Chigul" Omeruah as Ijeoma
  Patrick Diabuah as Patrick (Ghost)
 Bimbo Manuel as God
 Saheed Balogun as Divisional Police Officer
 Ali Nuhu as Mr. King
 Tina Mba as Ijeoma's mother
 Akah Nnani as Seargent
 Uche Jombo as Patrick's mother
 Kemi Lala Akindoju as Principal
 makida Moka as Indian Ninja
 Adetomiwa Edun as Akin
 Dorcas Shola Fapson as Akin's girlfriend
 Damilola Adegbite as herself (cameo)

Reception 
Nollywood Reinvented rated the film a 59% out of 100.

References

External links 

Nigerian comedy films
2017 films
2017 action comedy films
2010s fantasy action films
2017 fantasy films
Nigerian action films
Nigerian fantasy films
Films set in Lagos
Films shot in Lagos